The Vère is a  river in the Tarn and Tarn-et-Garonne departments in southern France. Its source is at Taïx. It flows generally west-northwest. It is a left tributary of the Aveyron, into which it flows at Bruniquel.

Departments and communes along its course
This list is ordered from source to mouth: 
Tarn: Taïx, Cagnac-les-Mines, Mailhoc, Villeneuve-sur-Vère, Noailles, Cestayrols, Cahuzac-sur-Vère, Vieux, Le Verdier, Castelnau-de-Montmiral, Sainte-Cécile-du-Cayrou, Puycelci, Larroque
Tarn-et-Garonne: Bruniquel

References

Rivers of France
Rivers of Occitania (administrative region)
Rivers of Tarn (department)
Rivers of Tarn-et-Garonne